Brianne Berkson is an American actress, comedian and producer known for films Bridge and Tunnel (2014), Bad Vegan and the Teleportation Machine (2016), Dare (2009) and Exposed (2016).

Early life and education

Brianne Berkson was born in New York to Simon Bergson, the son of Auschwitz survivors, and Stefany Dobken Bergson. After high school, she went on to attend Columbia University, where she graduated and received a B.A. in English & Comparative Literature.

Career
As an actress, Brianne has appeared in various films, live theater and TV. She made her acting debut in the film Happy End.

In 2009, she appeared in the film Dare.

In 2011, she started her own production company, Everlasting Films.

In 2014, she appeared in a comedy Bridge and Tunnel and won a best supporting actress award from Maverick Movie Awards.

In 2016, she appeared in the film Exposed.

In 2017, Brianne produced and co-wrote "Fly Away", a short film part of the Cannes Film Festival.

According to a May 2018 news interview with WPIX Channel 11, she is filming a comedy hip-hop Series named “BriGuel’.

In August 2018, Brianne (as BriGuel) released "LOVE" a song and music video featuring Klept of The Notorious B.I.G.'s Junior Mafia

TV
Brianne has appeared on a few television series, including Rescue Me, (Season 2009) and a TV movie called Oh Be Joyful (2006).

Production Work

In 2011, Brianne started her own production company named Everlasting Films. She produced, cowrote, and starred in the film Bad Vegan and the Teleportation Machine that was released in 2016 at the Woodstock Film Festival.

Comedy
In 2009, Brianne produced, wrote, and starred a one-woman show called "A Longhardt Look at Love with Chad Longhardt." She played 11 characters.

In 2010, the show played at Comix NY which restarted Brianne's stand-up comedy career.

Brianne voiced a character in Grand Theft Auto IV game.

In 2012, Brianne was involved the viral comedy prank "Mrs. Irrelevant".

In 2014, Brianne was involved in the comedy project GlobalAmbassador.nyc website spoofing Taylor Swift's “Welcome to New York” site.

BriGuel 
BriGuel is an artist duo consisting of Brianne Berkson and Miguel Glückstern.

In 2020, BriGuel premiered “The Difference”, “No One Really Knows”, and their debut EP "2020 Vision". The EP was entirely produced by Matt Chiaravalle, and it features Andres Gonzalez.

The EP was inspired by a documentary movie "The Difference" that was also produced by BriGuel, Andres Gonzalez and the Baltimore based, Holistic Life Foundation. “The Difference” movie was featured at the Tribeca Film Festival.

Personal life
Berkson currently lives in Brooklyn with fiancée and creative partner Miguel Glückstern.

References

External links

Living people
People from Manhattan
Columbia College (New York) alumni
American film actresses
American television actresses
American film production company founders
Comedians from New York City
American women film producers
Film producers from New York (state)
21st-century American comedians
People from Brooklyn
21st-century American actresses
Year of birth missing (living people)